Adriene Mishler (born September 29, 1984) is an American yoga instructor, actress, and entrepreneur, based in Austin, Texas. She produces and hosts Yoga With Adriene on YouTube and is co-founder of yoga video subscription service Find What Feels Good.

With over 11 million subscribers and over 600 videos, Yoga with Adriene ranks in the top 1000 most subscribed YouTube channels as of June 2022.

Biography

Mishler was born in Austin, Texas, into an "artsy family". Her mother is of Mexican descent. Her father is Jewish. She began her career as a professional film and television actor, as well as performing as a voiceover artist, but after taking a yoga class at a studio, Mishler had a realization that she wanted everyone she knew to "have this experience [of yoga]", and completed a yoga teacher training course.

Career 
Mishler started Yoga With Adriene in 2012, with the help of her producer and business partner Chris Sharpe, whom she met when working as the lead on a horror indie film. Sharpe had already helped create a successful YouTube channel, Hilah Cooking, with his wife, and was keen to apply these skills to the wellness industry.

Mishler first collaborated with Adidas in 2015 as part of their revamp of their women's business, featuring a new focus on female athletes and active personalities. She was part of the "I'm Here to Create" film series and was the face of her own yoga clothing line, as well as a member of the Adidas Women Global Creator Network. Adidas x WANDERLUST launched their FW17 line through an International Yoga Day livestream led by Mishler, attended by over 665,000 people. In 2018, she made a tour of Europe leading yoga mass classes.

Every year since 2015, she has launched a 30-day yoga challenge, releasing one video every day starting on January 1.

Also in 2015, she launched the yoga video subscription service Find What Feels Good.

Reception 
Mishler's laid back personality and beginner-friendly teaching style has been widely praised in the media, being described by Marisa Meltzer of The Guardian as "the yoga girl next door". Her dog Benji often appears on her videos, next to her mat. In 2015, its channel was the most searched yoga class in Google. In 2016, she received the Streamy health and well-being prize. In 2018 according to The Guardian, she had 4 million subscribers. During the COVID-19 pandemic, her YouTube channel gained more attention from viewers looking for at-home fitness videos to do while in lockdown. On April 13, 2020, Yoga With Adriene received 1.8 million daily views. In April 2020 her channel had more than 7 million subscribers. In June 2022, her channel had 11,1 million subscribers.

Acting
 American Crime (2004) – TV series, directed by John Ridley.
 Joe (2013) – film, directed by David Gordon Green.
 Everybody Wants Some!! (2016) – film, directed by Richard Linklater.
 Day 5 (Season 2, 2017) – web television series.

Voice acting
 DC Universe Online – voices Supergirl, Raven and Lois Lane

References

External links
 
 The 9 Best Yoga With Adriene Videos, According To A Superfan at Bustle

YouTubers from Texas
Health and fitness YouTubers
American voice actresses
21st-century American actresses
American film actresses
Actresses from Austin, Texas
American yoga teachers
American actresses of Mexican descent
People from Austin, Texas
Living people
1984 births